Major-General Harry Lionel Pritchard,  (16 November 1871 – 14 May 1953) was a British Army officer who served as General Officer Commanding Malaya Command from 1929 to 1931.

Military career
Pritchard was the son of Colonel Hurlock Pritchard, of Camberley, and was educated at Charterhouse School. He was commissioned into the Royal Engineers in 1891. He took part in the Fourth Anglo-Ashanti War in 1895 and was then transferred to the Egyptian Army in 1896, taking part in the Siege of Khartoum the following year. He was awarded the Distinguished Service Order for service in the Sudan.

Pritchard served in the Second Boer War in 1899 and then became a Deputy Assistant Director at the War Office in 1904. He was appointed Deputy Assistant Quartermaster General in India in 1907.

Pritchard served in the First World War, initially in France and Belgium and then in Egypt. He was made Chief Engineer for Middle East Forces in 1916, and was severely wounded in 1917. 

After the war, he was appointed Chief Engineer at Northern Command in 1921 and then Assistant Director for Fortifications and Works at the War Office in 1923. 

In 1926, he was appointed Chief Engineer for Eastern Command and, in 1929, he became General Officer Commanding Malaya Command. His final appointment was as Commandant of the Royal School of Military Engineering at Chatham in 1931; he retired in 1933.

Family
Pritchard married Elizabeth Gilbert Furse, daughter of E. Furse, of Alphington, Frimley, at the parish church, Frimley, on 3 September 1902.

Bibliography
A. R. P. and high explosive by Harry Lionel Pritchard, 1938, Duckworth

References

 

|-

1871 births
People educated at Charterhouse School
1953 deaths
British Army personnel of World War I
Royal Engineers officers
Companions of the Order of the Bath
Companions of the Order of St Michael and St George
Companions of the Distinguished Service Order
British Army major generals
British military personnel of the Fourth Anglo-Ashanti War
British Army personnel of the Mahdist War